Bolotnoye (lit. swampy) is a town and the administrative center of Bolotninsky District in Novosibirsk Oblast, Russia, located  northeast of Novosibirsk, the administrative center of the oblast. Population:

History
Bolotnoye began with the establishment of a way station along the Siberian Route at the town's present location, in 1805. By 1896, when the Trans-Siberian Railway had reached the same location, the area was known as Bolotnovskaya. A railway station with buffet service was established there and development of an accompanying settlement began in earnest. The name was later shortened to Bolotnoye. Bolotnoye was officially granted town status only in 1943.

Administrative and municipal status
Within the framework of administrative divisions, Bolotnoye serves as the administrative center of Bolotninsky District. As an administrative division, it is incorporated within Bolotninsky District as the Town of Bolotnoye. As a municipal division, the Town of Bolotnoye is incorporated within Bolotninsky Municipal District as Bolotnoye Urban Settlement.

References

Notes

Sources

External links
Official website of Bolotnoye 
Bolotnoye Business Directory 

Cities and towns in Novosibirsk Oblast
Populated places established in 1805
1805 establishments in the Russian Empire